The Science and Public Policy Institute (SPPI) is a United States public policy organization which promotes climate change denial.

Staff
The organization's executive director is Robert Ferguson, and the chief policy adviser is Christopher Monckton. Joe D'Aleo is the institute's Meteorology Adviser. Further science advisers, as listed in 2011, include:
 Robert M. Carter
 Craig D. Idso
 William Kininmonth
 David Legates

Willie Soon was at one time the chief science advisor.

Publications
The Science and Public Policy Institute funded a film "Apocalypse? No!" intended to show errors in the Al Gore documentary, An Inconvenient Truth. It shows Monckton giving a presentation to the Cambridge University Union.

The SPPI took an interest in the Climatic Research Unit email controversy ("Climategate"). 
Its position is elaborated in a 45-page paper released in December 2009, titled Climategate: Caught Green-Handed!: Cold facts about the hot topic of global temperature change after the Climategate scandal, which concluded that global warming is a myth.

Funding
The Institute is operated by The Frontiers of Freedom Foundation, Inc., a policy organization founded in 1996 by former Senator Malcolm Wallop, Republican of Wyoming. On its website SPPI does not detail the sources of its funding.  In 2002, Frontiers of Freedom had a budget of $700,000, with fossil-fuel company Exxon-Mobil donating $230,000 of that sum.

References

External links
 Official website
 Science and Public Policy Institute at SourceWatch
 Science and Public Policy Institute at Issuepedia

Climate change denial
Organizations of environmentalism skeptics and critics
Political and economic think tanks in the United States
Year of establishment missing